The Dongfeng-17, is a Chinese solid-fuelled road-mobile medium-range ballistic missile that mounts the DF-ZF Hypersonic Glide Vehicle.

The DF-17 along with the DF-ZF, was officially unveiled at the National Day military parade on 1 October 2019, making this China's first operational hypersonic weapon systems and one of the world's first to be put in full initial operation.

Design

The DF-17 uses the rocket booster from the already operational DF-16B short-range ballistic missile. As such, the design of the missile itself did not require any major changes. The biggest change however, is the obvious usage of a hypersonic glide vehicle rather than a conventional re-entry warhead(s) found in normal ballistic missiles and MIRVs.

The DF-ZF HGV operates in a different manner from normal ballistic missiles or even intercontinental ballistic missiles in the first place. Rather than firing and landing in a normal arc, the DF-17's HGV suppresses its trajectory and accelerates to reach Mach 5. 

Due to its suppressed, lower altitude trajectory, intercepting the glide vehicle with ABM shielding becomes far harder and more complex than that of a conventional re-entry vehicle. This is further complicated, as the gliding makes the DF-ZF far more maneuverable; extending both its range and avoiding potential ABM shielding. As such, the DF-17 could hit regional targets despite its SRBM nature. The DF-17 can also be used to mount a more conventional re-entry vehicle than the DF-ZF.

Development
Testing of DF-17 prototypes was underway by 2014. At least nine test flights occurred between January 2014 and November 2017.

The HGV test flight of 1 November 2017 launched from the Jiuquan Satellite Launch Center in Inner Mongolia. The missile's payload flew approximately 1,400 kilometers with the HGV flying at a depressed altitude of around 60 kilometers following the completion of the DF-17’s ballistic and reentry phases. The test followed the first plenum of the Communist Party of China’s 19th Party Congress in October.

The missile was officially unveiled during the National Day parade on 1 October 2019.

Strategic implications 
In March 2020, the United States Department of Defense proposes to accelerate the development of conventionally armed hypersonic glide vehicles (HGV) to keep pace with the Chinese development. Michael Griffin, former Under Secretary of Defense for Research and Engineering, presented House Armed Services Committee that the United States needs to develop hypersonic weapons "to allow us to match what our adversaries are doing."

See also 
 DF-ZF - Hypersonic glide vehicle and the main armament of the DF-17.
 Avangard - Russia's ground-based hypersonic glide vehicle.
 Long-Range Hypersonic Weapon - USA's planned hypersonic glide vehicle.

References 

Ballistic missiles of the People's Republic of China
Medium-range ballistic missiles
Military equipment introduced in the 2010s